India is a country in South Asia. It is the seventh-largest country by geographical area, the second-most populous country with over 1.2 billion people. India consists of twenty-eight states and eight union territories. It is a home to 17.5 percent of the world's population.

The first population census in British India was conducted in 1872. Since 1951, a census has been carried out every 10 years. The census in India is carried out by the Office of the Registrar General and Census Commissioner under the Ministry of Home Affairs, and is one of the largest administrative tasks conducted by a federal government.

The latest population figures are based on data from the 2011 census of India. India has 641,000 inhabited villages and 72.2 percent of the total population reside in these rural areas. Of them 145,000 villages have population size of 500–999 persons; 130,000 villages have population size of 1000–1999 and 128,000 villages have population size of 200–499. There are 3,961 villages that have a population of 10,000 persons or more. India's 27.8 percent urban population lives in more than 5,100 towns and over 380 urban agglomerations. In the decade of 1991–2001, migration to major cities caused rapid increase in urban population. The number of Indians living in urban areas has grown by 31.2% between 1991 and 2001. Yet, in 2001, over 70% lived in rural areas. According to the 2011 census, there were 52  (don't be confused - as per provisional census 53) million-plus cities in India (independent city is taken only if it is not a part of any urban agglomeration, otherwise urban agglomeration is taken), with Mumbai, Delhi and Kolkata having populations over 10 million.

There are 52  (don't be confused - as per provisional census 53) town/urban agglomerations (independent town is taken only if it is not a part of any urban agglomeration) in India with a population of 1 million or more as of 2011 against 35 in 2001 before revision of population of Towns/Urban Agglomerations in Kerala . About 43 percent of the urban population of India lives in these cities.

List
The cities/Urban Agglomerations (U.A.) which are listed in bold are either the capital of the respective state / union territory or the capital is part of the respective Town/U.A. - example Gandhinagar, a state capital is a part of the Ahmedadbad U.A. U.A. is added after the name of Urban Agglomeration (U.A.) but it is not added after the independent town which is not a part of any U.A.. The mentioned final figures are slightly different from provisional figures.

Source: 

Note: * Chandigarh U.A. was in the list of million plus populous Town/U.A. as per provisional census having 51st rank but finally, it was excluded from the list of million plus populous Town/U.A. with 55th rank after two less than million populous Town/U.A - Mysore U.A., Bareilly U.A. and as a result of it, number of million plus populous Town/U.A. is 52 though as per provisional census it was 53. As a result, the rank of Tiruchirappalli changed from 52 to 51 and that of Kota 53 to 52.

See also
 List of cities in India by population
 List of metropolitan areas in India
 List of states and union territories of India by population
 Demographics of India

Notes

References

Further reading

External links
 Office of the Registrar General & Census Commissioner, India

Urban
Urbanization in India